The women's 5000 metres speed skating competition of the Vancouver 2010 Olympics was held at Richmond Olympic Oval on February 24, 2010.

Records
Prior to this competition, the existing world and Olympic records were as follows.

Results

References

External links
 2010 Winter Olympics results: Ladies' 5000 m, from http://www.vancouver2010.com/; retrieved 2010-02-24.

Women's speed skating at the 2010 Winter Olympics